Pool 1 of the Second Round of the 2009 World Baseball Classic was held at Petco Park, San Diego, California, United States from March 15 to 19, 2009.

Like the first round, Pool 1 was a modified double-elimination tournament. The final two teams played against each other for seeding and both advanced to the semifinals.

Bracket

Results
All times are Pacific Daylight Time (UTC−07:00).

Japan 6, Cuba 0

South Korea 8, Mexico 2

Cuba 7, Mexico 4

South Korea 4, Japan 1

Japan 5, Cuba 0

Japan 6, South Korea 2

External links
Official website

Pool 1
World Baseball Classic Pool 1
2000s in San Diego
Baseball competitions in San Diego
International baseball competitions hosted by the United States
International sports competitions in California
World Baseball Classic Pool 1